Gábor Vas (born 29 August 2003) is a Hungarian football midfielder who plays for OTP Bank Liga club Paksi FC.

Career statistics
.

References

External links
 
 

2003 births
Living people
Hungarian footballers
Hungary youth international footballers
Association football midfielders
Paksi FC players
Nemzeti Bajnokság I players
People from Szekszárd
Sportspeople from Tolna County